Sukomoro Station (station code: SKM) is a third-class railway station in Sukomoro, Sukomoro, Nganjuk Regency, East Java, Indonesia, operated by Kereta Api Indonesia. This station is located on  Kertosono–Nganjuk Road and 200 m southwest of Pasar Bawang Merah Nganjuk ("Nganjuk garlic market" in Indonesian). This station's new building is operated—which has four tracks (two main lines and two passing tracks)—since Baron–Nganjuk double track segment activation on 14 March 2019.

Services 
This railway station has no train services except for train overtaking.

References

External links 

 Kereta Api Indonesia - Indonesian railway company's official website

Nganjuk Regency
Railway stations in East Java